Brown Building, also known as the Ream Building, is a historic commercial building located at Morgantown, Monongalia County, West Virginia. It was designed in 1898 by noted Morgantown architect Elmer F. Jacobs. It is a four-story eclectic style brick building. It has a flat roof and projecting cornice. It has a ball finial and parapet centered on the front facade.  It features polychromatic brick detailing, accentuated bays and a triad of double-sash windows

It was listed on the National Register of Historic Places in 1985. It is located in the Downtown Morgantown Historic District, listed in 1996.

References

Buildings and structures in Morgantown, West Virginia
Commercial buildings completed in 1898
Commercial buildings on the National Register of Historic Places in West Virginia
National Register of Historic Places in Monongalia County, West Virginia
Individually listed contributing properties to historic districts on the National Register in West Virginia
1898 establishments in West Virginia